Polia mortua is a species of moth of the family Noctuidae. It is found in the Russian Far East, Korea, Japan and Taiwan.

Subspecies
Polia mortua mortua
Polia mortua caeca Hreblay & Ronkay, 1997 (Taiwan)

References

Moths described in 1888
Hadenini
Moths of Japan